Procopio was a Mexican bandit.

Procopio may also refer to:

 Procopio (comics), an Italian comic strip
 the title character of Don Procopio, a two-act opera buffa by Georges Bizet
 Procopio Bonifacio  (1873–1897), Philippine independence activist and politician
 Procópio Cardoso (born 1939), Brazilian former football player and coach
 Procopio Cutò (1651–1727), Italian chef
 Procopio Franco (born 1970), Mexican former long-distance runner
 Bruno Procopio (born 1976), Brazilian harpsichord player
 Rubén Procopio (born 1961), American animation and comic book artist
 Zezé Procópio (1913–1980), Brazilian football player

See also 
 Procopius (disambiguation)